The Arado E.560 was a series of multi-engined Arado medium-range tactical bombers projected during the Second World War.

The Arado E.560 designs were part of the propaganda-based Wunderwaffe concept. None of the projected bombers were built, as the project took place near the end of the Third Reich and was terminated by the end of the war in Europe.

History
The Arado E.560 designs were a development based on the Arado 234, and they share some characteristics with that plane.

Only five designs of Ar E.560 variants have survived; the remaining are unknown. Except for two variants which were propeller-driven aircraft, the other three E.560 designs were to have been powered by turbojets. They were all equipped with retractable tricycle undercarriage.

Variants
All of the Arado E.560 variants had a pressurized cockpit for a crew of two, located at the front end of the fuselage.

Ar E.560 2
Four-engined bomber project, powered by four-row radial propeller engines.

Ar E.560 4
Four-engined bomber project powered by turbojet engines. The wings were swept back.

Ar E.560 7
Smaller two-engined bomber project powered by turboprop engines. It had swept back wings.

Ar E.560 8
Six-engined bomber project powered by turbojet engines. It had swept back wings.

Ar E.560 11
Four-engined bomber project powered by turbojet engines. It had swept back wings.

See also

References

External links

E.560
Abandoned military aircraft projects of Germany
World War II jet aircraft of Germany
E.560
E.560